Maurice Eustace may refer to:
 Maurice Eustace (priest) (d. November 1581)
 Maurice Eustace (Lord Chancellor) (d.1665), previously MP for Athy and County Kildare
 Sir Maurice Eustace, Baronet (d.1693) Jacobite MP for Blessington
 Maurice Eustace (Harristown MP) (d.1703), MP for Knocktopher (Parliament of Ireland constituency) and Harristown (Parliament of Ireland constituency)

See also
Eustace (surname)